Sustainable automotive air conditioning is the subject of a debate – also known as the Cool War – about the next-generation refrigerant in car air conditioning. An advocacy group, The Alliance for CO2 Solutions, supports the uptake of carbon dioxide (CO2) as a refrigerant in passenger cars, and the chemical industry is developing new chemical blends.

The Alliance for CO2 Solutions propositions the car industry to replace more unsustainable chemical substances with the natural refrigerant like carbon dioxide (CO2, R744/ R-744) in car cooling and heating. They claim that this would lead to 10% fewer emissions from new cars, potentially reducing global greenhouse gas emissions by 1%.

Opponents of the advocacy group claim that CO2 refrigeration technology is not cost-efficient nor safe, and support the development of new chemical refrigerant blends instead.

Background
A debate had emanated from the decision of the European Union to phase out the current high global warming refrigerant HFC-134a in car air conditioning from January 2011 onwards. To comply with the legislation carmakers have to decide on new refrigerants, as they typically need 3 to 4 years to develop and introduce a new car platform including the new air conditioning system.

Arguments

Arguments for CO2
The Alliance for CO2 Solutions and its supporters agree that the refrigerant CO2 is:

More environmentally friendly with the lowest global warming potential (GWP) of all currently used and proposed refrigerants. CO2 does not deplete the ozone layer. Because the carbon dioxide used in car air conditioning is a recycled industrial waste product, it is an environmentally neutral solution.  The Alliance claims that using a CO2-based air conditioning system will reduce total car emissions by 10%, thereby sparing the planet 1% of total greenhouse gases.
More technically ready because CO2 models have been developed and tested in all climates, being now ready for mass production. They are faster to heat and cool a car, and show superior performance in over 90% of all driving conditions.
More cost-efficient because as a refrigerant itself, CO2 is cheap and worldwide available. The servicing of CO2 systems will be less costly and less complicated than that of present systems. For the consumer, the total cost of ownership is lowest with CO2 as it will significantly cut fuel consumption by the air conditioning device. Carmakers have to make an initial investment estimated at €20 per unit, with no additional costs once CO2 Technology enters into mass production.
Usable in Heat Pumps because at least one CO2 system under development can act as a heat pump, supplying cabin heat and windshield defrosting even before the engine has warmed up.
Although the Alliance may not mention it, since CO2 is so cheap and relatively harmless to the environment, the reservoirs in such systems could store additional liquid R744 to keep a vehicle cool even when the engine (or compressor) was not running.
Technology is readily developed long ago. During the RACE Project from 1994 to 1997, financed by the EU with nearly 2 Million Euros, main producers of cars agreed to develop CO2 car AC systems. See . The result was that car AC systems for CO2 small cars are 45% more expensive than HFKW Units and that for the luxury class the additional cost was irrelevant. There is a final presentation of the Project containing this data.

Arguments against CO2
CO2 Technology requires the design of completely new high-pressure systems whereas so-called "drop-in solutions" (the adaptation of current systems to new substances) are potentially more cost-efficient.

The Alliance for CO2 Solutions claims, however that the initial costs of CO2 systems will be around €5 higher than drop-in solutions and that over a car's life cycle, CO2 air conditioning systems will be more cost-efficient than any currently used or proposed new chemical blends. (see Arguments for CO2).
 has been classified as Safety Class A1 (low-toxic, non-flammable refrigerant) by the American Society of Heating, Refrigerating and Air-Conditioning Engineers (ASHRAE) – the highest safety class possible.  As the charge of CO2 to the air conditioning systems is very small (200-400 g) there is no real danger for the passengers, even in case of accidental release.

Arguments for non-CO2 refrigerants

Refrigerants such as the Greenpeace-developed 'Greenfreeze', based on purified butane/propane mixtures, are entirely 'natural', and due to increased efficiency over refrigerants such as R134a, allow the use of very small amounts of refrigerant to be used.
The use of pure hydrocarbon refrigerants, which are 'backward compatible' with even early Freon (R-12) car air conditioning systems, would allow these systems to be easily converted (without modification), increasing their efficiency, and preventing further release of harmful R-134a and R-12 to the atmosphere.

Arguments against non-CO2 refrigerants
Butane and propane are very flammable petroleum products; they are used as fuels for gas barbecue grills, disposable lighters, etc. Like gasoline, to which it chemically is closely related, propane tends to explode if mixed with oxygen and ignited in an enclosed container.

The use of highly flammable hydrocarbon gases such as butane and propane as automotive refrigerants raises serious safety concerns.  The EPA, in evaluating motor vehicle air conditioning substitutes for CFC-12 (Freon, or R-12) under its SNAP program, has classified as "Unacceptable Substitutes" other "Flammable blend[s] of hydrocarbons" because of "insufficient data to demonstrate safety."  The EPA defines "Unacceptable" in this context as "illegal for use as a CFC-12 substitute in motor vehicle air conditioners".  All of the refrigerants which the EPA approved for motor vehicle use in place of CFC-12 (as of 28 September 2006) contain no more than 4% of total flammable hydrocarbons (butane, isobutane, and/or isopentane). Therefore, it appears unlikely, for safety reasons, that EPA will approve 'Greenfreeze' or similar hydrocarbon-based refrigerants for automotive use.

History
In September 2007, the German Association of the Automotive Industry (VDA) officially announced its decision to use CO2 as the refrigerant in next-generation air conditioning. Other carmakers from Europe and the rest of the world may follow the German lead.

A working group at ACEA, the European carmakers' association, was to be drafting a common position on the issue to be adopted across the whole industry by end-2007.

However, on 9 April 2009, German public television channel ARD aired a report claiming that VDA members would be using loopholes in the law to avoid complying with the EU directive.

Positions
Deutsche Umwelthilfe - Press Release 6 September 2007
Greenpeace Germany - News Release 6 September 2007
Alliance for CO2 Solutions - Press Release 6 September 2007
Alliance for CO2 Solutions - Press Release 30 July 2007
Alliance for CO2 Solutions - Press Release 13 June 2007
Deutsche Umwelthilfe - Press Release 13 July 2007
German Federal Environment Agency (Umweltbundesamt) - Press Release 8 May 2007

Media coverage
Spiegel-Online.de (06/09/2007)
ENDS Europe Report - August edition

European Voice (07/07/12)
Euractiv (07/06/26)
[(07/06/18)]

See also

Automobile air conditioning
EcoCute, is an energy efficient electric heat pump that uses carbon dioxide as a refrigerant

References

External links
R744.com Website dedicated to CO2 Technology
Shecco.com

Heating, ventilation, and air conditioning
Automotive cooling systems
Sustainable design